John J. O'Neill was a Major League player. He was born in New York City.

Little is known about this utility who played for the New York Giants in parts of two seasons. Used as a backup catcher for John Warner and Frank Bowerman, O'Neill appeared in four games and went hitless in 15 at-bats (.000). As a catcher, he collected 19 outs with eight assists and committed four errors for a .931 fielding percentage.

External links
Baseball Reference
Retrosheet

New York Giants (NL) players
Major League Baseball catchers
Baseball players from New York (state)
Year of birth unknown
Year of death unknown
Date of death unknown
Milwaukee Creams players
19th-century baseball players